Rotherham Civic Theatre is a converted Congregational church in Rotherham, South Yorkshire, England which is now a medium-scale proscenium arch theatre playing host to a wide program of professional and amateur dance, drama, musicals, children's theatre, comedy, music and pantomime.

External links
 Official Website

Buildings and structures in Rotherham
Theatres in South Yorkshire